The Papel languages of southern Senegal, Gambia, and northwestern Guinea-Bissau are:
Mankanya
Mandjak
Papel

They are an uncontroversial cluster of the Bak languages and form a dialect continuum. All of these names are exonyms.

Classification
Doneux (1975) classifies the Manjaku (Papel) languages as follows.

Manjaku
Mankañ
Hula
Woo
Cur
Central
Bok
Lund
Bok
Tsaam
Siärär
Coastal
Yu
Sis
Pèpèl

See also
Proto-Manjaku reconstructions (Wiktionary)

References

 
Bak languages